EchoStar V was a communications satellite built by Space Systems/Loral based in Palo Alto, CA and operated by EchoStar. Launched in 1999 it was operated in geostationary orbit at a longitude of 148 degrees west. EchoStar V was used for direct-to-home television broadcasting services.

Satellite 
The launch of EchoStar V made use of an Atlas rocket flying from Launch Complex 36 at the Cape Canaveral Air Force Station, United States. The launch took place at 06:02 UTC on September 23, 1999, with the spacecraft entering a geosynchronous transfer orbit.

Specifications 
 Launch mass: 
 Power: 2 deployable solar arrays, batteries
 Stabilization: 3-axis
 Longitude: 148° West

See also
 1999 in spaceflight

References

Spacecraft launched in 1999
Communications satellites in geostationary orbit
Satellites using the SSL 1300 bus
E05